Barry Island is an island lying in the centre of the Debenham Islands, off the west coast of Graham Land in Antarctica. Barry Island was charted by the British Graham Land Expedition (BGLE) under John Riddoch Rymill, who used Barry Island for a base in 1936 and 1937. Barry Island was named by John Riddoch Rymill for Kenneth Barry Lempriere Debenham (1920–43), the eldest son of Frank Debenham, member of the British Graham Land Expedition Advisory Committee (BGLE Advisory Committee). The Argentinian base San Martín is located on this island.

References

Further reading 
 Ben Saul, Tim Stephens, editors Antarctica in International Law, P 269

See also 
 Composite Antarctic Gazetteer
 List of Antarctic and sub-Antarctic islands
 List of Antarctic islands south of 60° S
 SCAR
 Territorial claims in Antarctica

Islands of Graham Land
Fallières Coast